Benjamin Pascal Lecomte (born 26 April 1991) is a French professional footballer who plays as a goalkeeper for  club Montpellier.

Early life
Lecomte was born in Paris.

Club career

Lorient

On 26 October 2010, Lecomte made his professional debut for Lorient in a Coupe de la Ligue against Monaco. Lorient lost the match 5–3 on penalties. On 20 January 2011, Lecomte signed his first professional contract after agreeing to a three-year deal with Lorient.

Montpellier
On 29 June 2017, Lecomte signed with Ligue 1 side Montpellier after Lorient was relegated.

Monaco
On 15 July 2019, Lecomte signed with Monaco on a five-year deal.

Loan in Spain 
On 20 August 2021, Lecomte moved abroad for the first time in his career, signing a one-year loan deal with La Liga defending champions Atlético Madrid. However, despite the club playing in three major tournaments with a somewhat busy schedule, he spent all 51 games of the season on the bench as a substitute for Jan Oblak.

On 13 July 2022, Lecomte signed with La Liga side Espanyol on a season-long loan.

Return to Montpellier 
On 26 January 2023, Lecomte returned to Montpellier for a transfer fee in the region of €3 million. On his Montpellier debut against PSG, he saved 2 penalties from Kylian Mbappé. He chose the club's number 40 jersey.

International career
Lecomte was a French youth international and has served as the goalkeeper at under-19 and under-20 levels. On 3 September 2018, Lecomte was called up to the senior France squad for the first time to face Germany and the Netherlands after captain Hugo Lloris was ruled out due to injury.

Career statistics

References

External links

Profile at the Atlético Madrid website

1991 births
Living people
Footballers from Paris
French footballers
France youth international footballers
Association football goalkeepers
Chamois Niortais F.C. players
FC Lorient players
Dijon FCO players
Montpellier HSC players
AS Monaco FC players
Atlético Madrid footballers
RCD Espanyol footballers
Ligue 1 players
Ligue 2 players
Championnat National 2 players
French expatriate footballers
Expatriate footballers in Spain
French expatriate sportspeople in Spain